Dead Girls is a science fiction novel by British author Richard Calder, first published in the UK in 1992 (HarperCollins) and 1995 in the US (St Martin's Press). It was his début novel.

The novel is the first in Calders 'Dead' trilogy, and is followed by the novels Dead Boys and Dead Things.

Background 
The novel was written in 1990, soon after Richard Calder had taken up residence in Thailand. He was living in Nongkhai, a small town on the Mekong River, overlooking Laos. He was also making frequent trips to Bangkok. Nongkhai, Bangkok and London are the story's most important locales.

Dead Girls is a science fiction novel set in the year 2071 telling the tale of a virus that turns pubescent girls into vampiric gynoid dolls called Lilim, and the doomed love affair between 15-year-old Ignatz Zwakh and a Lilim assassin called Primavera.

The idea for the quantum clockwork Cartier dolls comes from the story of Coppellia, a mechanical doll in one of the Tales from Hoffmann. Richard Calder cites Jacques Offenbach's opera version of the tale in which Hoffmann falls in love with Olympia as being particularly influential.

Another influence was the doll sculptures of Hans Bellmer

Plot

Road to Nowhere
Ignatz Zwakh, former escort of assassin Primavera Bobinski, is tracked down in Thailand by the half-robotic Pikadon Twins, with a demand from Primavera's half-robot boss Madame Kito that Ignatz return to the Big Weird to work with Primavera.  Primavera is a Lilim - a vampiric living dead girl.

Wine and Roses
Ignatz returns to Nana, Bangkok, and is reunited with Primavera.  They go to a restaurant that uses gynoids to mimic the English vogue of killing Lilim.  The Cartier automata were invented by a Dr Toxicophilous with robotic consciousness that harnessed 'quantum magic', and this quantum-mechanical seat of consciousness is situated in the womb of their descendants, the Lilim.  The pair are in the restaurant on a job from Madame Kito, but while Primavera is engaged in assassinating one of Kito's rivals Ignatz is rendered unconscious.

Beata Beatrix
Ignatz and Primavera, now captured and rendered unconscious with a special girdle around her umbilicus (navel), are taken by Jack Morgenstern to the American Embassy, where they are locked up.

Black Spring
Jack Morgenstern reveals that the British government want Primavera and Ignatz returned to them, and Kito has betrayed them to the Americans.  Morgenstern questions Ignatz regarding the amount of Lilim escapees from the supposedly quarantined London, but gets no response to his theory that one of the surviving original Cartier dolls called Titania is organising the breakouts.  Primavera uses her quantum magic to telepathically induce her guard to release her from her umbilicus girdle, then physically smashes through the wall of her prison, allowing herself and Ignatz to escape by jumping into the river below.  Due to the umbilical girdle Primavera's quantum matrix has been infected by hostile nanobots which are inhibiting her full use of quantum magic and are slowly destroying her.  Primavera believes that Kito has been blackmailed into betraying them.  Primavera and Ignatz leave Nana by boat.

Ignatz apologises for running away from Primavera.  Ignatz and Primavera make love, Ignatz requiring medical attention for blood loss afterwards.  Primavera determines to confront Kito in order to be cured of the nanovirus.  Primavera orders new clothes for herself and Ignatz made from living dermoplastic.

Going to a Go-Go
Primavera and Ignatz return to Nana, gaining entrance to Kito's penthouse in the Grace Hotel, only to be captured by Kito and her robot guards.  Primavera begs Kito to remove the nanovirus that is killing her.  She reveals that her telepathic dreams while captured told her that Kito is being blackmailed by Jack Morgenstern: years ago during a trade war Cartier infected Kito's fake dolls with an impotence STD and in response Kito sent her own virus to infect the genuine Cartier dolls in Paris - a virus that Morgenstern thinks responsible for the doll plague.  Primavera says she can disprove this by telling Kito of Titania and how she and Ignatz escaped England...

Westward Ho
Vlad Constantinescu and the Human Front win the British election, and the systematic execution of Lilim by impalement through the umbilicus begins.  Primavera and Ignatz decide to runaway together, and flee through the flooded London Underground tunnels to hide in the West End.  The pair are captured by a group of doll-killer paramedics, but are rescued by a pair of Lilim.  Primavera and Ignatz are taken to meet Titania - the last of the original infected Cartier dolls and Queen of the Lilim - at her hideout under a Whitechapel warehouse.

A Fairy Queen
While telling her story Primavera passes out, and Kito has her resident research and development technician Spalanzani examine her.  The 'magic dust' virus consists of nanomachines that are transforming the Ylem at the heart of her being from a quantum mechanical state to a classical mechanical state, which will render her quantum 'magic' inert.  Kito agrees to allow Spalanzani to remove the nanomachines on the condition that Ignatz continues his story...

Primavera and Ignatz are led into The Seven Stars - Tatiana's underground palace, where they meet Tatiana and her human consort Peter Gunn.  At Tatiana's prompting, Peter tells Primavera and Ignatz their story...

The Lilim
Peter's father (Dr. Toxicophilous) was a quantum engineer, a toy maker who built dolls for Cartier, though with the outbreak of doll plague his services are no longer in demand.  Titania, his last and greatest creation, acts as a housemaid at the Gunn family home.  Peter and Titania visit The Seven Stars that they are constructing as a private playground and Peter unlocks her matrix with his father's key, but infected with a sickness Titania stays there, and cocoons herself as she begins to transform.  Peter's father tells him that the rumor that the doll plague was started by a rivals from the East was a lie, and that it is the result of his own dark childhood dreams subconsciously infecting the quantum structure of the dolls when he created them.

Unreal City
Jack Morgenstern and the Pikadon Twins enter Spalanzani's workshop: having bugged it Morgenstern has heard the whole story.  Morgenstern has bought enough shares to depose Kito from her company and place the Pikadon Twins in her place.  Morgenstern instructs his men to take Primavera but a green light explodes from her umbilicus and Morgenstern, his men, Ignatz, Kito and Spalanzani are sucked inside Primavera's quantum matrix.

Inside the matrix they find themselves in a dream world that is geographically a collision of London and the Big Weird, complete with another copy of Primavera.  Primavera is unable to wake herself up and return them to reality, so accompanied by Ignatz and Morgenstern she tries to find Dr Toxicophilous: according to Primavera Toxicophilous is present in all dolls and represents the programme that controls their files - he also has the key to her matrix that can wake her up.  Morgenstern tries to convince Primavera that he is actually working with Titania, not against her.  The dream city is filled with clones of Primavera, with the nanovirus represented by Jack the Ripper-style figures.  Unable to find Dr Toxicophilous Primavera realises she needs to look deeper inside herself: she gazes into her own umbilicus and is sucked through, followed by Ignatz and Morgentren.

Psychic Surgery
Primavera, Ignatz and Morgenstern confront Dr Toxicophilous. Toxicophilous tells Primavera that Titania had betrayed her: thanks to his subconscious corruption of Titania's quantum consciousness he had created a living being with a death wish, and Titania has the ability to instil this death wish in Lilim at will.  Titania had been negotiating with Morgenstern over using the Lilim as instruments of US foreign policy to infect and destabilise hostile foreign countries, then cauterize the infection by use of the death wish.  Dr. Toxicophilous gives Ignatz the key to Primavera's matrix, he inserts it into her umbilical and the dreamers are returned to the reality of Spalanzani's workshop.

Spalanzani is killed when he tries to stop Morgenstern shooting Primavera.  Due to them waking up at different times Kito gets a head start on her enemies and traps the Pikadon Twins, while Morgenstern is shot and rendered unconscious.  Kito re-hires Primavera and Ignatz to work for her.

Desperadoes
Kito, Primavera and Ignatz find themselves on the run from the Pikadon Twins and Jack Morgenstern.  Kito says she can get help from a friend called Mosquito.

Having been taken in by Titania Primavera and Ignatz spend time at The Seven Stars, chaperoned by a Lilim called Josephene .  Ignatz asks for a view of England beyond that of the quarantined London and Josephene shows him via the visual circuits of a shop-window dummy in Manchester, revealing a nightmare world where the Human Front have replaced the dolls with re-animated human corpses, 'Mememoids' whose brains have been taken over by replicating information patterns transmitted via a comic strip called Cruel Britannia, and castrated policemen with guns as phallic replacements.  Following the completion of her transformation and indoctrination Primavera is sent out of England to spread the doll plague through Europe.  Together with Ignatz she is led through The Seven Stars to a service tunnel in the Channel Tunnel.

Kito takes Primavera and Ignatz to meet Mosquito, an old employee who she had previously used to attempt to spread her virus to the Cartier dolls, to ask for money.  Back on the road Ignatz and Primavera are attacked by the Pikadon Twins, and though they manage to kill them they lose Kito in the process.

Dead Girls

Ignatz and Primavera try to escape down the Mekong river, but Primavera collapses as she gives in to Titania's death wish.  A hologram of Titania appears and explains to Ignatz that the only way the Lilim can survive is by keeping their numbers under control by culling themselves.  Primavera dies.

Adaptations 
Richard Calder and the Filipino artist Leonardo M. Giron have turned Dead Girls into a graphic novel. This was published in 2014. Act 1 - The Last of England was serialised in Murky Depths #9 to #12 and collected in a limited edition full-colour hardback (published January, 2011) by the imprint The House of Murky Depths. Act 2 began in Murky Depths #16 (Summer, 2011). There are no plans to make graphic novels of the rest of the Dead series,  but an eight-comic series launched in March 2012 to replace the serialisation that was cut short with the demise of Murky Depths with Issue #18. An Indiegogo crowd funding campaign had been instigated by publisher The House of Murky Depths to produce the 208-page trade paperback graphic novel.

Dead Girls has been adapted into German Radio Drama Tote Mädchen and broadcast on Norddeutscher Rundfunk in 2014. It stars Janina Stopper as Primavera and Maximilian Mauff as Iggy.

Reception

Kirkus Reviews described the novel as:

References

External links
 Dead Girls, The Graphic Novel
 Murky Depths
 Richard Calder's official website

1992 novels
1992 science fiction novels
2071
HarperCollins books
Fiction set in the 2070s
1992 debut novels